The men's 10 kilometre sprint at the 1999 Asian Winter Games was held on 3 February 1999 at Yongpyong Cross Country Venue, South Korea.

Schedule
All times are Korea Standard Time (UTC+09:00)

Results
Legend
DNF — Did not finish

References

Results

External links
Schedule

Men Sprint